Abdilaqim Ademi (December 20, 1969 – February 15, 2018) was Minister of Education and Science of Republic of Macedonia.

References

 A delegation of the Ministry of Education and Science headed by the Minister Abdilaqim Ademi visited SEEUTechPark
 Macedonia’s Green Initiatives Creating FDI Opportunities
 Government to open “Mother Teresa” university in Skopje

External links
 Ministry Website 

1969 births
2018 deaths
Deputy Prime Ministers of North Macedonia
Education ministers of North Macedonia
Science ministers of North Macedonia
People from Tetovo